North Las Vegas is a suburban city in Clark County, Nevada, United States, in the Las Vegas Valley. As of the 2010 census it had a population of 216,961, with an estimated population of 251,974 in 2019. The city was incorporated on May 1, 1946. It is the fourth largest city in the state of Nevada.

History
During the 1860s, Conrad Kiel established a ranch at the modern-day intersection of Carey Street and Losee Road in what would be North Las Vegas. In 1917, libertarian Thomas L. Williams of Eureka, Utah visited the Las Vegas Valley, back when Las Vegas, Las Vegas Indian Colony, and Arden were the only entities in the valley. He did not approve of Las Vegas, perhaps because of its rowdiness (he was a Christian, or at least went to church), or because Las Vegas' attempts at municipal control over its citizens. However, he was pleased by the abundance of the valley's artesian water and potential for agriculture. Two years later in 1919, he moved himself and his family (his wife and three sons) to a 160-acre piece of land a mile from Las Vegas. That year, he founded his town, developing the town by building he and his family a house, sinking a well, grading roads, extending power lines, and forming a system of irrigation ditches. Williams believed that churches and church people should govern the new town, and so encouraged churches to buy property in the town. In 1919, the federally enforced Volstead Act was passed, which prohibited the sale, possession, and consumption of alcohol. Since there was no local law against alcohol, and because of a system of tunnels that would connect the town's underground speakeasies, the town attracted bootleggers from Las Vegas, although Williams was initially unaware of this. This gave his town the nickname of "Old Town". When he did discover of it, he stuck with agriculture for his economic purposes.

In 1924, Williams built his second house that was the first business of the town. It was named the Oasis Auto Court, and it contained a grocery store, a campground, a post office, a community center, and a telephone. At the time, it was the town's only telephone. Between 1928 and 1935, a large influx of workers from the Hoover Dam settled in Williams' town, as Las Vegas was intolerant towards them. In 1932, the town board was created. That same year, the town's first grammar school, Washington School, opened. A proper name had not yet been established for the town, and Williams did not want it named after himself, which lead to the town board voting for either "North Las Vegas" or "Vegas Verde" (which means "Green Meadows" in Spanish). "Vegas Verde" won, and that became the name for the town for a few months. George Hansen, a town board member who voted for the name "North Las Vegas", noticed that at one town board meeting, two members who voted the name "Vegas Verde" were absent. The vote for a name came once again, and "North Las Vegas" won. In 1939, Williams died of stroke, and that left North Las Vegas to the ruling of the town board. An elementary school, and a road, were eventually named after him. During World War II, the Las Vegas Aerial Gunnery School opened in North Las Vegas. It would eventually become Nellis Air Force Base. North Las Vegas was the subject of many annexation attempts from Las Vegas. On May 1, 1946, North Las Vegas was incorporated as a city. In 1957, North Las Vegas planned to annex an area to its southeast, and in response, the Clark County Commission created the town of Sunrise Manor to prevent further annexation attempts.

On May 13, 1964, First Lieutenant Raynor Lee Hebert, a student pilot from Port Arthur, Texas, took off from Nellis Air Force Base at approximately 2:00 PM on an F-105 fighter jet. He radioed his flight leader saying that he could not retract his nose gear, and thus couldn't gain altitude. He was at an height high enough to bail out, but too low that if he did, he would've hit Lincoln Elementary School, which was in session with 800 students. He kept the plane nose up long enough to pass the school, and eventually hit nine residential houses on Lenwood Avenue. The crash killed Hebert and four civilians. Hebert Memorial Park was created by the City of North Las Vegas with a plaque at the crash site to commemorate Hebert.

In the early 1960s, North Las Vegas had a major growth boom. The 1970s in North Las Vegas saw a growth in poor neighborhoods, population density, and crime. In 1988, former mayor James Seastrand said in one interview,

In the 1990s, North Las Vegas annexed about 60 square miles of empty desert surrounding the city, reportedly for more "upscale" housing.

On January 29, 2022, nine people were killed and a tenth critically injured following a six-vehicle crash on an intersection in North Las Vegas. The crash occurred after a speeding Dodge Challenger ran a red light and struck the other five vehicles. It was the deadliest road accident in the area in recent history.

Geography

Located within the Mojave Desert in the southwestern United States, North Las Vegas sits northeast of Las Vegas. In the Las Vegas Valley, there are several prominent mountain ranges nearby.

Climate
Due to its location within the Mojave Desert, North Las Vegas has a desert climate. Temperatures are generally mild in the winter and hot in the summer. Like most of the hot deserts of the United States, snowfall only occurs once every few years on average. In winter, temperatures rarely fall below freezing. In the summer, monsoons can reach the area, bringing heavy rain and thunderstorms.

Demographics

2000 US census
As of the 2000 census, there were 115,488 people, 34,018 households, and 27,112 families residing in the city. The racial makeup of the city was 55.93% White, 19.02% African American, 0.82% Native American, 3.24% Asian, 0.53% Pacific Islander, 15.78% from other races, and 4.68% from two or more races. 37.61% were Hispanic or Latino of any race.

There were 34,018 households, out of which 47.8% had children under the age of 18 living with them, 57.3% were married couples living together, 15.2% had a female householder with no husband present, and 20.3% were non-families. 13.6% of all households were made up of individuals, and 3.2% had someone living alone who was 65 years of age or older. The average household size was 3.36 and the average family size was 3.67.

In the city the population was spread out, with 33.9% under the age of 18, 9.6% from 18 to 24, 34.3% from 25 to 44, 16.4% from 45 to 64, and 5.8% who were 65 years of age or older. The median age was 29 years. For every 100 females, there were 104.3 males. For every 100 females age 18 and over, there were 103.1 males.

The median income for a household in the city was $46,057, and the median income for a family was $46,540. Males had a median income of $32,205 versus $25,836 for females. About 11.8% of families and 14.8% of the population were below the poverty line, including 19.6% of those under age 18 and 8.8% of those age 65 or over. The United States Census Bureau listed North Las Vegas, as well as the Las Vegas metropolitan area, as one of the fastest-growing regions in the United States.

2010 US census
At the census of 2010, there were 216,961 people residing in North Las Vegas. The racial makeup was 47.4% White, 19.9% African American, 0.8% Native American, 6.3% Asian, 0.8% Pacific Islander, and 5.8% from two or more races. Hispanic or Latino residents of any race were 38.8% of the population, and 31.2% of the population was non-Hispanic White.

Economy

Bigelow Aerospace is headquartered in North Las Vegas. Traditionally, manufacturing, industrial and warehouse distribution companies have dominated the local market. However, high-tech businesses, including solar and green technology, and custom manufacturing facilities are moving to North Las Vegas.

On May 12, 2019 Amazon opened a 850,000-square-foot fulfillment center in North Las Vegas which currently employs more than 1,500 people.

In October 2019 Sephora opened a 715,000-square-foot distribution center in North Las Vegas.

Florence McClure Women's Correctional Center, Nevada's only female correctional facility, is located in North Las Vegas.

Master-planned communities in the city include Aliante and Eldorado. The Apex industrial Park is now a part of the city as well.

North Las Vegas has many medical/recreational marijuana dispensaries, and opened the first 24-hour dispensary in the Las Vegas Valley.

Government

Mayor and council
The city of North Las Vegas provides recreational amenities, police and fire protection, and water and wastewater services. The city, which was incorporated in 1946, encompasses . The city operates under a council-manager form of government, with a mayor and four council members. The mayor is elected at large; and council members must live within, and are elected by their wards. The city has two municipal judges who are elected at large.

City management
The city manager and city attorney are appointed by and report to the city council. The city manager's administration consists of an Economic Development Division, Strategic Planning Division, community Outreach Division, Communications and Marketing Division and the following departments: Administrative Services, City Clerk, Community Services and Development, Finance, Fire, Human Resources, Police, Public Works, the North Las Vegas Library District, and Utilities.

The City of North Las Vegas operates an extensive system of open spaces, parks and leisure services. Six of the city's parks feature water amenities, including pools, ponds and spray pads. The city also runs two recreation centers.

In June 2011 the city opened a third recreation center—SkyView Multi-Generational Recreation Center—focused on mufti-generational fitness and recreation. It is operated by the YMCA under contract to provide quality amenities and programs for residents of all ages.

North Las Vegas park officials recently completed  of regional trails along the Lower Las Vegas Wash and along the Upper Las Vegas Wash. These paved trails connect with Southern Nevada's Neon to Nature regional trail system, which is used for hiking, biking and leisurely strolls.

The North Las Vegas Library District operates three full-service libraries—North Las Vegas Library, Aliante Library and Alexander Library. Each offers public access computers, adult and children's programming and meeting rooms in addition to books, downloadable media, DVDs, magazines and newspapers. Each also provides wireless connectivity to the Web for patrons who wish to use their electronic devices.

The North Las Vegas Library, was the city's first library to open in 1966. Aliante Library opened to the public in May 2006 adjacent to the Nature Discovery Park, one of the most popular recreation amenities in North Las Vegas. Alexander Library, the city's newest state-of-the-art facility, opened in March 2009 and is adjacent to a two-acre park that includes tot lots, shade structures, paved and lighted walking paths and demonstration gardens.

Police
The North Las Vegas Police Department was established in 1946 (when the city incorporated) to serve North Las Vegas, which at that time consisted of four square miles and a population of around 3,000. NLVPD grew to keep pace with the rapid growth of the city of North Las Vegas and Clark County. As of 2016, NLVPD provided law enforcement services to an area of 100.48 square miles (260.2 km2) and a population of approximately 233,808 citizens. As of July 2016, NLVPD had 309 commissioned personnel (Police and Detention Officers) and 106 civilian support personnel.

Education

North Las Vegas is home to the Cheyenne Campus of the College of Southern Nevada. As of 2013, the University of Nevada, Las Vegas was planning to open a branch in North Las Vegas near the I-215 Beltway, though this plan has yet to be implemented as of 2022.

Primary and secondary school students in North Las Vegas are served by the Clark County School District (CCSD), the fifth-largest in the United States with over 300,000 students enrolled in any of its 357 schools. CCSD has a workforce of over 35,000 people, and is considered a major employer in the county.

The following high schools are in North Las Vegas:

 Canyon Springs
 Cheyenne
 Legacy
 Mojave
 Rancho

Transportation
Domestic and international airline travel for the entire metropolitan area is handled at Harry Reid International Airport, south of Las Vegas, adjacent to the Las Vegas Strip.

The North Las Vegas Airport, formerly known as Sky Haven Airport, was established on December 7, 1941. A division of Vision Airlines operates tours to the Grand Canyon in Arizona from the airport.

RTC Transit provides bus service in the city, as it does throughout the Las Vegas metropolitan area.

The major highways/roads serving North Las Vegas are Interstate 15, Clark County Route 215, U.S. Route 93, Las Vegas Boulevard (SR 604) and Rancho Drive (SR 599 / US 95 Bus.)

See also
List of U.S. cities with large Hispanic populations
List of cities in Nevada
History of Nevada

Notes

References
 City of North Las Vegas Communications Division
 2013 North Las Vegas Community Report
 http://cityofnorthlasvegas.com/Departments/MayorAndCouncil/Files/SOTC13/CommunityReport2013.pdf

External links

 City of North Las Vegas official website
 City Data.com statistics

 
1919 establishments in Nevada
Cities in Clark County, Nevada
Cities in the Mojave Desert
Las Vegas Valley
Populated places established in 1919
Cities in Nevada